Interstate 175 (I-175) in St. Petersburg, Florida, also known as South Bay Drive, is a  spur route from I-275 into downtown St. Petersburg. It is also designated as the unsigned highway State Road 594 (SR 594). There is a sibling segment of freeway nearby designated as I-375.

Route description
The Interstate begins at I-275 with Tropicana Field on the northeast side of the interchange, going east into downtown St. Petersburg, passing through eastbound exits with 9th Street South/8th Street South and 6th Street South before the Interstate ends at 5th Avenue South next to an at-grade intersection with 4th Street South. Westbound, the Interstate begins with a split from southbound 4th Street South just north of the 4th Street South/5th Avenue South intersection and has no exits until the interchange with I-275. Along with its sister highway, I-375, I-175 lacks exit numbers.

History
The freeway was originally to have been a part of the former Pinellas Belt Expressway, which would have continued from its western terminus at I-275. The Pinellas Belt Expressway was budgeted in 1974 but was canceled in the late 1970s due to local opposition. I-175 was built between 1977 and 1980 and opened on April 23, 1980, at a cost of $5.5 million (equivalent to $ in ).

When I-75 was relocated in the late 1970s–early 1980s,  of additional Interstate became available; thus, the St. Petersburg feeder sections of I-175 and neighboring I-375 were upgraded to Interstate status.

Exit list

See also

References

External links

 I-175 @ SouthEastRoads.com
 Kurumi - I-175 Florida
 Interstate 175 Florida page at Interstate275Florida.com 

75-1 Florida
75-1
1
175
175
Expressways in the Tampa Bay area